Josua Bengtson (10 January 1882 – 15 December 1958) was a Swedish stage and film actor. He appeared prolifically as a character actor in the theatre and in Swedish cinema following his debut during the silent era. Some of his final screen appearances were in the Åsa-Nisse series.

Selected filmography

 Therèse (1916)
 His Lordship's Last Will (1919)
 Sir Arne's Treasure (1919)
 Bomben (1920)
 Karin Ingmarsdotter (1920)
 Thomas Graal's Ward (1922)
 House Slaves (1923)
 Where the Lighthouse Flashes (1924)
 Ingmar's Inheritance (1925)
 His English Wife (1927)
 Sealed Lips (1927)
 The Fight Continues (1941)
 Dangerous Ways (1942)
 The Case of Ingegerd Bremssen (1942)
 Ride Tonight! (1942)
 The Emperor of Portugallia (1944)
 The Serious Game (1945)
 The Happy Tailor (1945)
 Oss tjuvar emellan eller En burk ananas (1945)
 The Journey Away (1945)
 Crime and Punishment (1945)
 Meeting in the Night (1946)
 Soldier's Reminder (1947)
 Dinner for Two (1947)
 The People of Simlang Valley (1947)
 Foreign Harbour (1948)
 Lars Hård (1948)
 Big Lasse of Delsbo (1949)
 Åsa-Nisse (1949)
 Åsa-Nisse Goes Hunting (1950)
 My Name Is Puck (1951)
 Bom the Flyer (1952)
 Love (1952)
 Åsa-Nisse on Holiday (1953)
 No Man's Woman (1953)
 Our Father and the Gypsy (1954)
 Åsa-Nisse på hal is (1954)
 Violence (1955)

References

Bibliography
 Hong, Jai-Ung. Creating Theatrical Dreams: A Taoist Approach to Molander's, Bergman's and Wilson's Productions of Strindberg's A Dream Play. Coronet Books Incorporated, 2003.
 Steene, Birgitta. Ingmar Bergman: A Reference Guide. Amsterdam University Press, 2005.

External links

1882 births
1958 deaths
Swedish male silent film actors
Swedish male film actors
Swedish male stage actors
Actors from  Gothenburg
20th-century Swedish male actors